Fateh Bahadur Singh is an Indian politician and a six times member of the Uttar Pradesh Legislative Assembly from Campiyarganj and Paniyara of Gorakhpur district and former forest minister of Uttar Pradesh. He served as the pro-tem speaker in 17th Vidhan Sabha of Uttar Pradesh.

Personal life
He is the son of former Chief minister of Uttar Pradesh Vir Bahadur Singh. He is educated from Colonel Brown Cambridge School, Dehradun. He obtained his BBA from Sam Higginbottom University of Agriculture, Technology and Sciences, Allahabad.

References

Living people
Uttar Pradesh MLAs 1991–1993
Uttar Pradesh MLAs 2002–2007
Uttar Pradesh MLAs 2007–2012
Uttar Pradesh MLAs 2012–2017
Uttar Pradesh MLAs 2017–2022
1969 births
Bharatiya Janata Party politicians from Uttar Pradesh
Nationalist Congress Party politicians
Indian National Congress politicians
Bahujan Samaj Party politicians
Akhil Bharatiya Loktantrik Congress politicians
Uttar Pradesh MLAs 2022–2027
Sam Higginbottom University of Agriculture, Technology and Sciences alumni